The mass media in the Republic of Ireland includes all the media and communications outlets of the Republic.

Print media

Ireland has a traditionally a competitive print media, which is divided into daily national newspapers and weekly regional newspapers, as well as national Sunday editions. Competition from international markets is also strong in Ireland many publications from the US, the UK and Central Europe are widely available in Ireland. The strength of the UK press is a unique feature of the Irish print media scene, with the availability of a wide selection of British published newspapers and magazines, many of these UK editions produce specialist versions for the Irish market e.g. Irish Daily Mail and the Irish Sun. Some of the most popular national newspapers include The Irish Times, the Irish Independent and the Irish Examiner. Local and regional papers include The Kerryman, the Evening Herald and the Evening Echo. The use of digitised versions of newspapers and websites is increasingly becoming popular, however readership amongst physical newspapers is still high in Ireland when compared to other European countries.

Newspapers are popular in Ireland. According to the National Newspapers of Ireland and Joint National Readership Survey 91% of Irish adults regularly read newspapers. The market penetration for daily newspapers runs at 190% and 350% for Sunday titles. For comparison, US newspaper market penetration is only 51%.

There are several daily newspapers in Ireland, including the Irish Independent, The Irish Examiner, The Irish Times, Irish Daily Star, and the Evening Herald. The best selling of these is the Irish Independent, which is published in both tabloid and broadsheet formats.

The leading Sunday newspaper in terms of circulation is the Sunday Independent which has over a million readers each week, a very large number considering that Ireland has only 1.25 million households. Other popular papers include The Sunday Business Post, Irish Mail on Sunday and the Sunday World (the latter published in separate editions for the Republic and Northern Ireland).

One noted trend in Irish newspapers is the presence of Irish editions of UK newspapers, these include The Irish Sun, Irish Mirror, Irish News of the World, and the Irish edition of The Sunday Times.

Linear and digital broadcasting

Raidió Teilifís Éireann (RTÉ) is the public service broadcaster of Ireland and is funded by a licence fee and advertising. RTÉ operates four national television channels, RTÉ One, RTÉ2 RTÉ News Now and RTÉ Jr. Virgin Media Television operates four channels (Virgin Media One, Virgin Media Two, Virgin Media Three and Virgin Media Sport) and remains Ireland's biggest independent broadcasters

TG4 is a public service broadcaster for speakers of the Irish language. All of these channels are available on Saorview, the national free-to-air digital terrestrial television service. Additional channels included in the service are RTÉ One HD RTÉ Two HD, RTÉ News Now, RTÉjr, and RTÉ One +1.

Subscription services include Virgin Media Ireland (formerly UPC Ireland), Eir (telecommunications) and Sky Ireland, which offer a wide variety of television channels from outside of Ireland increasing competition for Irish broadcasters. The presence of on-demand streaming services such as Netflix have also increased pressure on private and public broadcasters in Ireland.

Most of the major broadcasters in Ireland operate streaming services such as RTÉ Player, Virgin Media Player and TG4 Player. Some Irish owned channels are subscription only these include Virgin Media Sport and the boutique of Eir Sport channels.

Radio broadcasting
Radio listenership is still very high in Ireland with 83% of Irish adults tuning into radio each day.

There are many national radio services operated by public broadcasters (RTÉ Radio 1, RTÉ 2fm, RTÉ lyric fm and RTÉ Raidió na Gaeltachta) and private broadcasters (Today FM, Newstalk and Classic Hits 4fm.

A national DAB service is also available which is largely made up of RTÉ's stations including digital only stations RTÉ 2xm, RTÉ Gold, RTÉ Pulse, RTÉ Radio 1 Extra and RTÉ Jr. Private broadcasters have yet to commit to DAB in Ireland, unlike in other European countries.

A large number of regional and local radio stations are available countrywide. A survey showed that a consistent 85% of adults listen to a mixture of national, regional and local stations on a daily basis. Local radio stations include 96fm, 98fm, Galway Bay FM to name a few.

Both radio and television broadcasters are regulated by the Broadcasting Authority of Ireland.

Film and television industry 

Supported by the Screen Ireland (formerly Irish Film Board), the Irish film ad television industry has grown significantly since the 1990s, with the promotion of indigenous films such as Intermission and Breakfast on Pluto, as well as the attraction of international productions such as Braveheart and Saving Private Ryan. Many television shows such as the Game of Thrones, The Vikings and other international shows have been produced/filmed in the Republic of Ireland and Northern Ireland.

Online 
Along with the online websites from the traditional media (newspapers, magazines, TV and radio), some of which complement their traditional offerings, there are a number of online media outlets and portals, such as TheJournal.ie, Joe.ie, Dublin Live and Irish Central (aimed at the Irish emigrant community).

References

 
Ireland
Ireland